The 2009 FIM Speedway World Championship Grand Prix of Nordic will be the eighth race of the 2009 Speedway Grand Prix season. It took place on 29 August in the Vojens Speedway Center in Vojens, Denmark. Vojens was GP host between 1995 and 2002.

The first Nordic SGP was won by Andreas Jonsson, who beat Rune Holta, Kenneth Bjerre and Emil Sayfutdinov in the final.

Riders 

The Speedway Grand Prix Commission nominated Niels Kristian Iversen as the wild card and Kenneth Hansen and Morten Risager as the track reserves. On 26 August in Danish league match between Esbjerg and Slangerup SK Kenneth Hansen feel on track and was hospitalize. The riders' starting positions draw for Grand Prix meeting was made on 28 August at 13:00 CEST by FIM Jury President Christer Bergström.

Heat details

Heat after heat 
 Crump, Walasek, Iversen, Gollob
 Pedersen, Jonsson, Hancock, Harris
 Sajfutdinov, Holta, Nicholls, Ułamek
 Bjerre, Lindgren, Adams, Andersen
 Jonsson, Lindgren, Ułamek, Iversen
 Bjerre, Crump, Holta, Harris
 Hancock, Andersen, Walasek, Nicholls
 Adams, Sajfutdinov, Gollob, Pedersen (Fx)
 Adams, Nicholls, Harris, Iversen
 Sajfutdinov, Jonsson, Crump, Andersen
 Ułamek, Bjerre, Pedersen, Walasek
 Holta, Lindgren, Gollob (F2x), Hancock (X)
 Hancock, Sajfutdinov, Bjerre, Iversen
 Pedersen, Lindgren, Crump, Nicholls
 Jonsson, Walasek, Holta, Adams
 Gollob, Ułamek, Andersen, Harris
 Pedersen, Holta, Andersen, Iversen
 Hancock, Ułamek, Crump, Adams
 Lindgren, Walasek, Sajfutdinov, Harris
 Gollob, Bjerre, Jonsson, Nicholls
 Semi-Finals:
 Sajfutdinov, Holta, Lindgren, Hancock
 Jonsson, Bjerre, Pedrsen, Ułamek
 The Final:
 Jonsson (6 pts), Holta (4 pts), Bjerre (2 pts), Sajfutdinov (0 pts - X)

The intermediate classification

See also 
 Speedway Grand Prix
 List of Speedway Grand Prix riders

References

External links 
 FIM-live.com 

N
2009
2009 in Danish motorsport